Kirra may refer to:

 Kirra, Phocis, village in Greece
 Kirra, Queensland, Queensland, coastal suburb and surf break

See also
Kiera, a given name
 Kira (disambiguation)